John Govan (30 December 1914 – 20 July 1996) was an Australian cricketer. He played in seven first-class matches for Queensland between 1932 and 1938.

See also
 List of Queensland first-class cricketers

References

External links
 

1914 births
1996 deaths
Australian cricketers
Queensland cricketers
Cricketers from Brisbane